South of the Border is an attraction on Interstate 95 (I-95),  US Highway 301 (US 301) and US 501 in Hamer, South Carolina, just south of Rowland, North Carolina. It is so named because it is just south of the border between North Carolina and South Carolina, and was the half way point to Florida from New York in the early days of motor travel. The area is themed in faux-Mexican style, alluding to Mexico's location south of its border with the United States. The rest area contains restaurants, gas stations, a video arcade, motel, truck stop, a small amusement park, a mini golf course, shopping, fireworks stores, and a motocross training complex. Its mascot is Pedro, a caricature of a Mexican bandido. South of the Border is known for its roadside billboard advertisements, which begin many miles away from and incorporate a mileage countdown to the attraction itself. The stop has since fallen on hard times as more modern hotel areas have grown along I-95.

Design
The entire motif of South of the Border can be described as intentionally campy. South of the Border is located at the intersection of I-95 and US 301/US 501 just south of the border between North Carolina and South Carolina. The site is a  compound that contains a miniature golf course, truck stop, 300-room motel, multiple souvenir shops, a campground, multiple restaurants, amusement rides, and a  observation tower with a sombrero shaped observation deck. It is also home to "Reptile Lagoon", the largest indoor reptile exhibit in the U.S.

Architectural features include "a Jetsons-esque starburst chandelier" in the lobby and Mimetic. Pedro's Pleasure Dome is a swimming pool inside "a junkyard version" of a geodesic dome. A Washington Post review says, "[F]lashing signs ... throw technicolor pink and green and blue onto every surface. No destination or sentiment is too small to be blared out in bright orange." Numerous large statues of animals such as dolphins, horses, dogs, gorillas and dinosaurs can be found. The Peddler Steakhouse, the nicest of the restaurants, is shaped like a sombrero, while the Mexican-themed Sombrero restaurant is not, though its décor includes sombreros, cactus and terra cotta, with lots of lime green. There are areas that bring to mind the photography of William Eggleston, the cinematography of David Lynch, and the gas station art of Ed Ruscha.

The motocross training center, known as South of the Border Motocross (SOBMX), is used for riders in training and a competitive race course.  The AMA regional championship motocross is held at South of the Border, and in the spring, the Monster Energy AMA Amateur National Motocross Championship organises a regional qualifier at South of the Border.  There are four circuits—a  motocross track, a Supercross training facility, an Arenacross training facility, and a second  motocross track.  By insurance regulations, only licensed AMA or FIM professional riders are permitted on the Supercross or Arenacross circuits.

History
South of the Border was developed by Alan Schafer in 1950. He had founded South of the Border Depot, a beer stand, at the location in 1949 adjacent to Robeson County which was, at one time, one of many dry North Carolina counties. Business was steadily expanded with Mexican trinkets and numerous kitsch items imported from Mexico. The site itself also began to expand to include a cocktail lounge, gas station and souvenir shop and, in 1954, a motel. In 1962, South of the Border expanded into fireworks sales, potentially capitalizing on the fact fireworks were illegal in North Carolina. In 1964 it was announced that the route for I-95 would pass right by South of the Border, and the facility would be next to two exits and within view of the highway.

Over the years, the billboards with messages some considered racist and offensive changed to become tamer while still retaining the same tongue-in-cheek tone. Schafer continued to deny his attraction was racist, citing the fact that he was known for hiring African Americans, and even helping them to vote, and standing up to the Ku Klux Klan.

About 300 people, mostly local employees, work at South of the Border. At one time, with 700 working there, it was the largest employer in Dillon County, South Carolina.

Mascot
Initially, Schafer only used sombreros and serapes in advertisements for South of the Border. However, after Schafer hired two men he had met on a business trip to Mexico as bellboys, people began calling them Pedro and Pancho, leading to the development of the Pedro mascot. Schafer eventually created Pedro, an exaggerated, cartoon-like representation of a Mexican bandit, to add to the exotic element and theme of the attraction. Pedro wears a sombrero, a poncho and a large mustache. Minstrel shows were still popular in Dillon County in the 1940s and 1950s, at about the time Pedro was created and P. Nicole King argues that Pedro embodies the way in which people exoticized Mexico or Mexicans at the time while working within the themes of camp

Pedro has likewise been referred to as culturally offensive, politically incorrect or racist. P. Nicole King described Pedro's likeness as a "southern Jewish guy in brown face" that was perhaps made, partially, in Schafer's image. Schafer himself had previously dismissed criticism that Pedro is an unfair characterization of Mexicans and argued that Pedro's design is a light-hearted joke. Today, all South of the Border employees, regardless of race, are referred to as "Pedro".

Pop culture
American storyteller, radio and TV personality, Jean Shepherd began his TV movie, The Great American Fourth of July and Other Disasters, with a trip to South of the Border. He stops at a fireworks market called Fort Pedro, which leads him into the story of the most memorable Fourth of July during his childhood in the fictional town of Hohman, Indiana.

The opening scene of Season 3, Episode 5 of Eastbound & Down shows characters Eduardo Sanchez Powers and Casper robbing a Mexican store leading the viewers to believe they were still in Mexico. The scene later reveals they were actually robbing the gift shop at South of the Border and are now traveling in the United States.

In Impractical Jokers: The Movie, the Jokers leave Q at a motel, to have him ride on horseback to South of the Border where the rest of the Jokers await him.

In the movie Forces of Nature (1999), starring Sandra Bullock and Ben Affleck, the main characters stop at South of the Border as passengers on a tour bus.

See also
 Tourist trap
 Ethnic stereotype
 Wall Drug, a similar attraction off Interstate 90 in South Dakota
 Breezewood, Pennsylvania

References

External links

South of the Border Motocross
Photo Gallery and Fun Facts about South of the Border - SCIway.net, South Carolina Information Highway
Article in Roadside America
Article in RoadTrip America

Amusement parks in South Carolina
Buildings and structures in Dillon County, South Carolina
Interstate 95
Landmarks in South Carolina
Roadside attractions in South Carolina
U.S. Route 301
U.S. Route 501
Tourist attractions in Dillon County, South Carolina
1950 establishments in South Carolina
Amusement parks opened in 1950
Novelty buildings in South Carolina
Motorsport venues in South Carolina
Truck stops